Two ships of the United States Navy have borne the name USS Batfish, named in honor of the batfish, any of several fishes; a pediculate fish of the West Indies, the flying gurnard of the Atlantic, or a California sting ray.

 , was a Balao-class submarine, commissioned in 1943 and struck in 1972.
 , was a Sturgeon-class submarine, commissioned in 1972 and struck in 1999.

Sources

United States Navy ship names